ASGT may refer to:

 American Society of Gene Therapy
 Acting Sergeant